The Chapel to Duke of York's Headquarters is a Grade II* listed chapel forming part of the Duke of York's Headquarters complex on King's Road, Chelsea, London.

It was built in 1824.

The building housed a branch of the clothing retailer Jigsaw. Since September 2021, it has been Soho Home Studio, a furniture and homewares store and cafe, run by Soho House.

References

Religious buildings and structures completed in 1824
Grade II* listed buildings in the Royal Borough of Kensington and Chelsea
Chapels in London